The ICFAI Foundation for Higher Education (IFHE or simply ICFAI) is a private deemed-to-be-university established under Section 3 of the UGC Act, 1956. It is located in Donthanapally, Shankarapally Road, Hyderabad.

IFHE is National Assessment and Accreditation Council (NAAC) A++ Grade University.

History 
IFHE, founded by N.J. Yasaswy,  is promoted by the ICFAI Group. The Institute of Chartered Financial Analysts of India (ICFAI), a non-profit educational society in Telangana, India, has established Universities and standalone business cchools in different parts of India. ICFAI was founded by N.J. Yasaswy, Besant C. Raj and Prasanna Chandra in 1984.

In Hyderabad, the ICFAI Business School Hyderabad (IBS Hyderabad) was established by ICFAI in 1995. In 2008, the institution obtained deemed-to-be-university status with the name 'ICFAI Foundation for Higher Education'. IBS Hyderabad became its first constituent as IFHE's Faculty of Management.

Abid Hussain was appointed the first Chancellor of IFHE, while J Mahender Reddy became the Vice Chancellor. After Abid Hussain's demise in 2012, C. H. Hanumantha Rao became the Chancellor. The current Chancellor is C. Rangarajan since 2015.

The Faculty of Science and Technology and the Faculty of Law was started after receiving approval from UGC in 2010. The School of Architecture was established in 2018.

Faculties and schools

Faculty of Management 
The Faculty of Management at IFHE is IBS Hyderabad and the major programs offered at IBS Hyderabad are MBA, PhD and BBA. It has adopted the case method of pedagogy, and has been recognised as one of the world's top case publishing schools.

As of 2020, IBS Hyderabad is the only institution in India that is offering Association to Advance Collegiate Schools of Business (AACSB)-accredited programs at the undergraduate, post graduate and doctoral levels. IBS Hyderabad is  SAQS (South Asian Quality Assurance System) accredited, since 2006, an accreditation conferred by The Association of Management Development Institutions in South Asia (AMDISA).

In 2020, IBS Hyderabad was ranked 25th among the Management schools in India in the NIRF rankings.

Faculty of Science and Technology 
Faculty of Science and Technology, commonly known as ICFAI Tech, is a constituent of IFHE, set up after receiving the UGC approval in 2010. Some of the featured courses are Civil Engineering, Computer Science and Engineering, Data Science and Artificial Intelligence, Electronics and Communication Engineering, Mechatronics Engineering and B.Sc – B.Tech Dual Degree.

Faculty of Law 
The Faculty of Law, commonly known as ICFAI Law School, is a constituent of IFHE started after getting the approval from UGC in 2010. The undergraduate programs offered by the Faculty of Law are approved by the Bar Council of India.

School Of Architecture 
The ICFAI School of Architecture (ISArch) was established in the year 2018 and offers a five-year full-time B.Arch. The degree program is recognized by the Council of Architecture, New Delhi.

Ranking and accreditation

Accreditation by NAAC 
IFHE has received the NAAC Accreditation 'A++' Grade with an Institutional CGPA score of 3.59 out of 4.

Graded Autonomy 
IFHE is accorded Autonomy by UGC in 2018, one of the 52 Universities in India to receive autonomy. The UGC granted graded autonomy Category II to IFHE.

References 

Higher education in India
Deemed universities in India
Education in Hyderabad, India
Universities in Telangana
Universities in Hyderabad, India
Educational institutions established in 1984
1984 establishments in Andhra Pradesh